Fine Hygienic Holding (abbreviated FHH), is a wellness company with dual headquarters in Amman, Jordan and Dubai, UAE, founded in 1958 by Elia Nuqul. Its current CEO is James Michael Lafferty. FHH mainly specializes in the production of wellness and hygienic products, including sterilized facial tissues, kitchen towels and toilet paper, baby and adult diapers, as well as natural, healthy beverages after obtaining a  majority stake in the Arabian natural food and beverage brand, Nai Arabia Food Co, and a recent addition of personal protective equipment (PPE), germ protection solutions and nutrition supplements . FHH employs over 3,000 people of more than 30 different nationalities, operating in Jordan, Egypt, Saudi Arabia, the UAE, and serves over 80 markets across the Middle East, Africa, Europe, Asia, and the United States.

History

Origin 
In 1952 Elia Nuqul, a Palestinian refugee, established Nuqul Brothers Company, a modest trade and import business for food and consumer goods. Nuqul went on to expand his original business into the production of hygienic paper products and founded Fine Hygienic Holding (formerly known as Fine Hygienic Paper Company) in 1958.

Expansion
After its beginning in Jordan, the company opened a converting factory in Saudi Arabia, then Egypt, then the UAE, and in 1991 Fine Hygienic Holding opened its first paper mill in Egypt. Following this expansion, the company began to expand beyond the region to enter markets on an international scale in Europe, Asia and Africa.

In 2015, Standard Chartered Private Equity acquired a minority stake in FHH, investing US$175 Million. Then, in 2019, the long-standing senior leadership of Standard Chartered Private Equity formed a company called Affirma Capital which now owns that stake of FHH.

In 2019, FHH further expanded into the wellness industry, acquiring a major stake, in the Arabian natural food and beverage brand, Nai Arabia Food Co.  In early 2020, FHH responded to the COVID-19 pandemic by launching the Fine Guard line of long-term germ protection products. First out was a reusable antiviral mask, later expanded to a range of masks, including sports and kids, as well as gloves, hand sanitizers, surface disinfectants, fabric sprays and more.

Operations

FHH operates a total of 5 full-scale paper mills in Jordan, Egypt, and the UAE, with a total annual production of around 210,000 tons, as well as 5 converting factories in Jordan, Egypt, Morocco, SAUDI ARABIA and the UAE.

FHH currently has 10 brands, under which a range of wellness and hygienic goods are produced, including Fine®, Fine Guard®, Motiva® among others.

Awards

In 2019, FHH received three of the Global Gender Diversity and Leadership Excellence Awards at the annual Leonie Awards

In 2019, At the GCC Best Employer Brand Awards FHH was awarded Best Employer Brand and the award for promoting health in the Workplace. In that same year, FHH received the Fitbit Award for Physical Activity from Daman Corporate Health and Wellness

FHH was the recipient of the Aon Hewitt Award in 2009 and 2014, classifying it among the top 15 employers in the Middle East.

Environmental Record and Sustainability
Fine Hygienic Holding is an active participant and signatory to the United Nations Global Compact and is committed to doing its part to implement socially and environmentally responsible business practices and offer open and transparent reporting on these efforts.

Products are made with eco-friendly, raw, 100% virgin tree pulp, which is provided by responsible suppliers that plant up to five trees for each tree used in the production process.

FHH reached its goal of zero landfill waste across all of its operations; as everything it disposes is sent to recycling facilities and reused for other manufacturing activities. FHH has reduced its hazardous waste to almost negligible amounts and is careful to ensure that even these small quantities are responsibly disposed of.

FHH achieved minimization of pulp, energy, and water consumption across all levels of operations. FHH treats and reuses wastewater via on-site treatment facilities which were upgraded through its water treatment project which was completed in 2018. 80% of wastewater from factory production is treated, with 35% being reused for production operations and the remainder donated to local agriculture.

In support of global efforts to reduce greenhouse gas (GHG) emissions, FHH has implemented a project that reduces  and GHG emissions at its facilities in Egypt. The project made the operation less reliant on grid-generated electricity, by diversifying the sources of electricity generation, ultimately reducing  emissions by an estimated 25,384 tons per year.

For FHH energy requirements, the company is committed to utilizing clean energy sources to reduce  emissions wherever possible. Two factories in the Kingdom of Jordan are now supplied with natural gas from Egypt, reducing reliance on fossil fuels and decreasing  emissions.

Corporate social responsibility
 
In 2007, FHH launched its flagship CSR program, Khair Al Koura, which promotes sustainable socioeconomic development in Al-Kourah District of Jordan's Irbid Governorate. It is the first public – private partnership for a sustainable development program in Jordan and focuses on empowering women and providing them with a sustainable income. Beneficiaries are engaged in a variety of programs empowering them to pursue new income-generating opportunities such as the development of a chemical-free farming project, a food processing unit, a soap and candle manufacturing operation, and a country kitchen, which uses local produce to prepare fresh and healthy meals. Since its initial launch, the program has become completely self-sustaining, offering over 320 products with more than 6,000 direct and indirect beneficiaries in the community.

Throughout the COVID-19 crisis FHH helps communities and governments fight the pandemic through the establishment of a relief fund which exceeded $2M USD.

In 2021, FHH launched its new CSR initiative Fine Academy, which draws on the groups expertise to train students in sector-relevant areas where there is a recognized skills-gap, including in supply chain management.

Furthermore, FHH supports a range of different causes including women's empowerment, education, health and well-being, independently and in cooperation with governments and civil society organizations in the countries where it operates.

References

Hygiene
Holding companies of Jordan
Jordanian companies established in 1952
Personal care companies